David Ian "Joe" Jackson (born 11 August 1954) is an English musician, singer and songwriter. Having spent years studying music and playing clubs, he scored a hit with his first release, "Is She Really Going Out with Him?", in 1979. It was followed by a number of new wave singles, before he moved to more jazz-inflected pop music and had a top 10 hit in 1982 with "Steppin' Out". Jackson is associated with the 1980s Second British Invasion of the US. He has also composed classical music. He has recorded 20 studio albums and received five Grammy Award nominations.

Biography

Early years
Born in Burton upon Trent, Staffordshire, England, David Jackson spent his first year in nearby Swadlincote, Derbyshire. He grew up in the Paulsgrove area of Portsmouth, where he attended the Portsmouth Technical High School. Jackson's parents moved to nearby Gosport when he was a teenager. He learned to play the violin but soon switched to piano, and prevailed on his father to install one in the hall of their Paulsgrove council house. Jackson began playing piano in bars at the age of 16, and also won a scholarship to study musical composition at London's Royal Academy of Music.

Jackson's first band, formed in Gosport, was called Edward Bear, later renamed Arms and Legs. The band broke up in 1976 after two unsuccessful singles. He was still known as David Jackson when he joined Arms and Legs, but he picked up the nickname "Joe", based on his perceived resemblance to the British television puppet character Joe 90, a genius child spy. Jackson legally changed his name to Joe at age 20. Jackson then spent some time performing on the cabaret circuit to make money to record a demo.

Joe Jackson Band
In 1978, a record producer heard Jackson's demo tape and signed him to A&M Records. The next year the newly formed Joe Jackson Band released their debut album Look Sharp! A mix of rock, melodic jazz, and new wave, it mined a vein similar to contemporaries Elvis Costello and Graham Parker. The album enjoyed wide critical success: in 2013, Rolling Stone magazine named Look Sharp! number 98 in a list of the 100 best debut albums of all time. Some commercial success also followed, as the debut single "Is She Really Going Out with Him?" reached the top 40 in five countries, and No. 9 in Canada.

The Joe Jackson Band released I'm the Man in 1979. The album followed a similar musical pattern, and received good, though not as strong, reviews. It did produce the single "It's Different for Girls", which became Jackson's highest charting UK single, peaking at no. 5. Beat Crazy followed in 1980. Jackson also collaborated with Lincoln Thompson in reggae crossover.

In 1981, Jackson produced an album for the British power pop group the Keys. The Keys Album was the group's only LP. The Joe Jackson Band toured extensively until it broke up. Jackson subsequently recorded an album of old-style swing and blues tunes, Jumpin' Jive, with songs by Cab Calloway, Lester Young, Glenn Miller, and Louis Jordan. The album, and associated single release, was credited to the band "Joe Jackson's Jumpin' Jive".

Jackson's 1982 album, Night and Day, was his only studio album to chart in the UK and US Top 10, peaking at No. 3 (UK) and at No. 4 (US). Two singles released from the album, "Steppin' Out" and "Breaking Us in Two", were US top 20 hits. The tracks "Real Men" and "A Slow Song" referred obliquely to New York City's early 1980s gay culture, critiquing its exclusiveness and asking for a slow song in the disco respectively. "Real Men" also became a top 10 hit in Australia.

By 1984, New York had become Jackson's home base, and he recorded Body and Soul there, an album he later said was "from the point of view of a relative newcomer". Heavily influenced by pop and jazz standards and salsa, it had the US No. 15 hit single "You Can't Get What You Want (Till You Know What You Want)".

In 1985, Jackson played piano on Joan Armatrading's album Secret Secrets, and in 1986 he collaborated with Suzanne Vega on the single "Left of Center" from Pretty in Pinks soundtrack. Jackson's next album was Big World, with all-new songs recorded live in front of an audience instructed to remain silent while music was playing. Released in 1986, it was a three-sided double record; the fourth side consisted of a single centering groove and a label stating "there is no music on this side". The instrumental album Will Power (1987), with heavy classical and jazz influences, set the stage for things to come later, but before he left pop behind, he put out two more albums, Blaze of Glory (which he performed in its entirety during the subsequent tour) and Laughter & Lust. In 1995, Jackson contributed his version of "Statue of Liberty" on a tribute album for the English band XTC called A Testimonial Dinner: The Songs of XTC.

Post-pop
In the late 1990s, Jackson expanded into classical music; he signed with Sony Classical in 1997 and released Symphony No. 1 in 1999, for which he received a Grammy for Best Pop Instrumental Album in 2001. In 2000, he released a follow-up album, Night and Day II.

In 2003, he reunited his original quartet for the album Volume 4, and a lengthy tour. In 2004, he contributed a cover of Pulp's "Common People" with William Shatner for Shatner's album Has Been. In 2005, he teamed up with Todd Rundgren and the string quartet ETHEL for a tour of the US and Europe. A dedicated smoker, he gave up his New York apartment in 2006 partly in protest over the ascendancy of smoking bans, and made the Berlin neighbourhood Kreuzberg his new home. It was there that he recorded, with longtime collaborators Graham Maby and Dave Houghton, his eighteenth studio album, Rain (Rykodisc, January 2008); the album was followed by a five-month tour.

In 2015, Jackson announced the completion of his follow-up to 2012's The Duke via his official website. The album's title, Fast Forward, and track list were confirmed in addition to North American tour dates. The titular first single was released for streaming via his official SoundCloud page. The entire record was briefly posted before being taken down a day later.

On 18 January 2019, Jackson released the album Fool, preceded by the songs "Fabulously Absolute", "Strange Land" and "Friend Better". Jackson said about the album on his website: "One of my inspirations for this album was the band I've been touring with on and off for the last 3 years. I've had many different line-ups but this one is special." Jackson and the band performed "Fabulously Absolute" on Jimmy Fallon's Tonight Show on 21 January 2019. Fool debuted in the top 20 album charts in Holland, Belgium, Germany and Switzerland. In the US, it debuted at No. 25 on Billboard'''s Top Album Sales Chart. In the UK, it entered the Indie Albums Chart at No. 13.

Personal life
Jackson spent a number of years living in New York City, which served as an inspiration for his 1982 song "Steppin' Out". In a 2018 interview, Jackson said "I don't like New York much these days. It's as if the city and I had a hot love affair and now we're just friends, but we still have to see each other to remain friends. Today I live in Berlin. The New York I knew in late '81 and '82 is gone." Jackson currently resides in Berlin, but also owns homes in New York and Portsmouth.

Jackson was married to his wife, Ruth, for two years, but the marriage ended in divorce and was later called a "disaster" by Jackson. In a 2001 interview with the Irish Independent, Jackson stated that he was in a relationship with a male partner. Jackson had previously discussed his bisexuality in his autobiography A Cure for Gravity. His questioning of potential homosexuality and same-sex attraction is explored in the 1982 single "Real Men".

Other activities
Jackson has actively campaigned against smoking bans in both the United States and the United Kingdom, publishing a 2005 pamphlet (The Smoking Issue) and a 2007 essay (Smoke, Lies and the Nanny State), and recording a satirical song ("In 20-0-3") on the subject.

Jackson wrote an autobiography titled A Cure for Gravity, published in 1999, which he described as a "book about music, thinly disguised as a memoir". It traces his working-class upbringing in Portsmouth and charts his musical life from childhood until his 24th birthday. Life as a pop star, he said, was hardly worth writing about.

Discography

 Look Sharp! (1979)
 I'm the Man (1979)
 Beat Crazy (1980)
 Joe Jackson's Jumpin' Jive (1981)
 Night and Day (1982)
 Mike's Murder (1983)
 Body and Soul (1984)
 Big World (1986, live)
 Will Power (1987)
 Tucker (1988)
 Blaze of Glory (1989)
 Laughter & Lust (1991)
 Night Music (1994)
 Heaven & Hell (1997)
 Symphony No. 1 (1999)
 Night and Day II (2000)
 Volume 4 (2003)
 Rain (2008)
 The Duke (2012)
 Fast Forward (2015)
 Fool (2019)

BibliographyA Cure for Gravity'', 1999, autobiography

Notes

References

External links

Joe Jackson archive by Andreas Wostrack
Joe Jackson's career on A&M Records with gallery, international discography
[ Joe Jackson biography] at AllMusic website
 Video-interview with Joe Jackson on revu.nl, 31 January 2008

1954 births
Living people
Alumni of the Royal Academy of Music
A&M Records artists
English expatriates in Germany
Bisexual men
Bisexual singers
Bisexual songwriters
English new wave musicians
English male singer-songwriters
English record producers
MNRK Music Group artists
Grammy Award winners
Male new wave singers
English LGBT singers
English LGBT songwriters
Musicians from Hampshire
Musicians from Staffordshire
People from Burton upon Trent
People from Paulsgrove
Rykodisc artists
Second British Invasion artists
Sony Classical Records artists
Virgin Records artists
20th-century English LGBT people
21st-century English LGBT people